Neatostema is a monotypic genus of flowering plants belonging to the family Boraginaceae. The only species is Neatostema apulum.

Its native range is Canary Islands, Mediterranean to Northern Arabian Peninsula.

References

Boraginoideae
Boraginaceae genera
Monotypic asterid genera